"The Moral Virologist" is a science fiction short story by Greg Egan. It was first published in September 1990 in Pulphouse Magazine, and subsequently republished in 1991's The Best of Pulphouse, in the Summer 1993 issue of Eidolon magazine, and in Egan's 1995 collection Axiomatic. An Italian-language version, "Il Virologo Morale", was published in 2003.

Synopsis

John Shawcross is a fundamentalist Christian who is disappointed that safe sex has limited the spread of HIV/AIDS, which he considers to be God's punishment for sexual immorality; consequently, he becomes a virologist, so that he may create a new, more lethal virus.

Reception

Rich Horton, writing at the SF Site, calls  "Virologist" "particularly memorable", while Jonathan Strahan describes it as a "standout".

Karen Burnham, writing in the New York Review of Science Fiction, however, considers Shawcross to be "cartoonish", and in her 2014 biography of Egan says that it is  a "heavy-handed critique" and "obviously contrived", with "the author's thumb on the scales."

Origin
Egan has described the story as "a fairly direct response to religious fundamentalists blathering on about AIDS being God's instrument".

References

External links
Text of the story at Egan's official site

Short stories by Greg Egan
1990 short stories
HIV/AIDS in literature
Bioterrorism in fiction